Øyulv Gran (1902 – 1972) was a Norwegian writer. His genres were crime and romance.

Øyulv Gran frequently wrote under various pseudonyms including: Øivind / Øyvind Grundt, Brynjulf Bagge, Alf Ottar Karlsrud Rakstad, and Stein Winge. He is most associated with the stories he wrote which appeared in the magazine Detektiv-Magasinet about the fictional Oslo detective Knut Gribb. In 1908, Norwegian  and author Sven Elvestad had created the fictional police detective Knut Gribb. The character was taken over by several other writers in various magazines and series of paperbacks. Starting in the 1970s, increasingly Øyulv Gran's presentation formed the basis for public perception of  Knut Gribb .

Many of his stories were published as books as well, including Svindler-syndikatet (1972), Mannen bak masken (1976) and Nattens konge (1985).

The writings of Gran was clearly anti-Semitic and anti-Communist, and he also wrote about the perceived Yellow Peril. During the Occupation of Norway by Nazi Germany, Gran's writings did not really reflect Nazi propaganda. Still, Gran was an active Nazi for some time.

References

External links
Svindler-syndikatet Norwegian
Knut Gribb Norwegian

1902 births
1972 deaths
Norwegian crime fiction writers
Norwegian collaborators with Nazi Germany
20th-century Norwegian writers
20th-century novelists